Beautiful Girl(s) may refer to:

Film and television  
 Beautiful Girl (film), a 2003 film directed by Douglas Barr
 Beautiful Girl (1990 film), a Philippine film starring Romnick Sarmenta
 Beautiful Girls (film), a 1996 film starring Matt Dillon and Uma Thurman
 "Beautiful Girls" (Desperate Housewives), a 2006 episode of Desperate Housewives
 "The Beautiful Girls" (Mad Men), a 2010 episode of Mad Men

Music 
 The Beautiful Girls, an Australian band
 "Beautiful Girls" (Sean Kingston song), 2007
 "Beautiful Girls" (Van Halen song), 1979
 "Beautiful Girl" (George Harrison song), 1976
 "Beautiful Girl" (INXS song), 1992
 "Beautiful Girl", a song by Aztec Camera from Frestonia
 "Beautiful Girl", a song by Bing Crosby
 "Beautiful Girl", a song by Chord Overstreet
 "Beautiful Girl", a song by Jose Mari Chan
 "Beautiful Girl", a song by Christian Bautista
 "Beautiful Girl", a song by Meja from Seven Sisters
 "Beautiful Girl", a song by Michael Jackson from The Ultimate Collection
 "Beautiful Girl", a song by Robyn Hitchcock from Eye
 "Beautiful Girl", a song by Sophie B. Hawkins from Wilderness